Thomas Weber may refer to:
 Thomas Weber (historian) (born 1974), German historian, university lecturer and writer
 Thomas Weber (American football) (born 1987), American football placekicker
 Thomas Weber (footballer) (born 1993), Austrian footballer
 Thomas E. Weber, American journalist